Amanita nehuta, also called Maori dust amanita, is a species of fungus in the family Amanitaceae. It was first described by New Zealand mycologist Geoff Ridley in 1991. It occurs in New Zealand in large number. It has only a dark ring rather than a universal veil and white spores. It is found under leptospermum and Nothofagus. It grows on ground usually in late summer. Its height is 110 mm and width is 100 mm.

Description

The physical description is as follows:
The cap is 25–65 mm wide, plano-convex to plano-depressed, buff, non-viscid, with a striate margin. The volval remnants are pulverulent on the center raised into wart-like peaksor warts or radial ridges, colored pale sepia. Gills are crowded and free, measure 6–7 millimeters wide, and appear white to pale buff. The short gills are subtruncate. Its stem, or stipe, is 20–75 × 4–11 millimeters, hollow, exannulate, with a smooth to subfloccose upper stem and smooth lower stem. The surface is white, pale buff, or very pale grayish sepia in color like the cap. The basal bulb is clavate to bulbous, 10–16 mm in diameter. The base has a rim or band of powdery volva, the same color as on the cap. The stem has no ring.

The spores measure 6.5–9 × 5.5–8 (-8.5) µm and are subglobose to broadly ellipsoid to ellipsoid and inamyloid. They are white in color. Clamps are absent at the bases of the basidia. The flesh is white, with a very pale area under the skin in the center.

Distribution and habitat

This species was originally described from Wellington, New Zealand, associated with many types of Nothofagus, Leptospermum, and Kunzea. It is also known from the South island of New Zealand.

Similar species
Amanita nehuta is said to be similar to Amanita farinosa, Amanita obsita, Amanita subvaginata and Amanita xerocybe. All these species appear to have a cap surface that gelatinizes late in development so that the volva remains intimately connected to the cap skin well into maturity of the fruiting body. For this reason, the cap often remains powdery looking well into maturity.

See also
List of Amanita species

References

External links

nehuta
Fungi of New Zealand
Fungi described in 1991